Tvoje lice zvuči poznato is the Croatian version of Your Face Sounds Familiar. It started on 5 October 2014. There are four judges in season one, Goran Navojec (actor), Sandra Bagarić (opera singer), Tomo in der Mühlen (music producer & DJ) and different guest judges in every episode. The winner is Mario Petreković, and the runner-up is Vanda Winter.

Format
The show challenges celebrities (singers and actors) to perform as different iconic music artists every week, which are chosen by the show's "Randomiser". They are then judged by the panel of celebrity judges including Goran Navojec, Sandra Bagarić and Tomo in der Mühlen. Each week, one celebrity guest judge joins Goran, Sandra and Tomo to make up the complete judging panel. Sandra Bagarić is also a voice coach and act coach. Tomo in der Mühlen is the Executive Music Producer of the show. Each celebrity gets transformed into a different singer each week, and performs an iconic song and dance routine well known by that particular singer. The 'randomiser' can choose any older or younger artist available in the machine, or even a singer of the opposite sex, or a deceased singer. Winner of each episode wins 10 000 HRK, and winner of whole show wins 40 000 HRK. All money goes to charity of winner's own choice. The show lasts 12 weeks.

Voting
The contestants are awarded points from the judges (and each other) based on their singing and dance routines. Judges give points from 4 to 12, with the exception of 11. After that, each contestant gives 5 points to a fellow contestant of their choice (known as "Bonus" points). In week 11 (semi-final week), four contestants with the highest number of votes will qualify to the final. In week 12 (grand final), previous points will be transformed into 4-7 system, jury will give the points from 8 to 12, and contestants will give 5 points to a fellow contestant of their choice.

Judges
Goran Navojec - Croatian actor, known for many roles on television series and in feature films.
Sandra Bagarić - Croatian opera singer
Tomo in der Mühlen - German-born music producer and DJ based in New York City and Zagreb.

Guest member

Mislav Čavajda (Week 1)
Joško Čagalj - Jole (Week 2)
Boris Đurđević (Week 3)
Nina Badrić (Week 4)
Enis Bešlagić (Week 5)
Indira Levak (Week 6)
Emilija Kokić (Week 7)
Jelena Rozga (Week 8)
Luka Nižetić (Week 9)
Tonči Huljić (Week 10)
Nives Celsius (Week 11)
Severina (Week 12)

Contestants

Color key:
 indicates the winning contestant that week
 indicates the contestant with fewest points that week
 indicates the eliminated contestant
 indicates the series winner
 indicates the series runner-up

Performance chart

Color key:
 indicates the contestant came first that week
 indicates the contestant came second that week
 indicates the contestant came last that week

Week 1
Guest Judge: Mislav Čavajda  Aired: 5 October 2014  Winner: Minea

Bonus points
Giuliano gave five points to Mario
Jasna gave five points to Giuliano
Mario gave five points to Baby Dooks
Andrea gave five points to Andrea
Baby Dooks gave five points to Vanda
Minea gave five points to Ronald
Ronald gave five points to Jasna
Vanda gave five points to Minea

Week 2
Guest Judge: Joško Čagalj - Jole  Aired: 12 October 2014  Winner: Mario Petreković

Bonus points
Vanda gave five points to Mario
Giuliano gave five points to Jasna
Ronald gave five points to Jasna
Baby Dooks gave five points to Mario
Andrea gave five points to Mario
Jasna gave five points to Mario
Minea gave five points to Mario
Mario gave five points to Giuliano

Week 3
Guest Judge: Boris Đurđević  Aired: 19 October 2014  Winner: Vanda Winter

Bonus points
Ronald gave five points to Giuliano
Giuliano gave five points to Vanda
Jasna gave five points to Baby Dooks
Baby Dooks gave five points to Vanda
Mario gave five points to Vanda
Andrea gave five points to Vanda
Vanda gave five points to Mario
Minea gave five points to Vanda

Week 4
Guest Judge: Nina Badrić  Aired: 26 October 2014  Winner: Ronald  Braus

Bonus points
Jasna gave five points to Ronald
Mario gave five points to Giuliano
Minea gave five points to Vanda
Andrea gave five points to Minea
Vanda gave five points to Jasna
Baby Dooks gave five points to Andrea
Ronald gave five points to Baby Dooks
Giuliano gave five points to Mario

Week 5
Guest Judge: Enis Bešlagić  Aired: 2 November 2014  Winner: Mario Petrekovic

Bonus points
Minea gave five points to Andrea
Baby Dooks gave five points to Giuliano
Mario gave five points to Minea
Ronald gave five points to Mario
Jasna gave five points to Jasna
Andrea gave five points to Ronald
Giuliano gave five points to Vanda
Vanda gave five points to Baby Dooks

Week 6
Guest Judge: Indira Levak  Aired: 9 November 2014  Winner: Vanda Winter

Bonus points
Vanda gave five points to Giuliano
Ronald gave five points to Vanda
Mario gave five points to Minea
Baby Dooks gave five points to Mario
Andrea gave five points to Andrea
Giuliano gave five points to Ronald
Minea gave five points to Jasna
Jasna gave five points to Baby Dooks

Week 7
Guest Judge: Emilija Kokić  Aired: 16 November 2014  Winner: Vanda Winter

Bonus points
Ronald gave five points to Minea
Minea gave five points to Baby Dooks
Jasna gave five points to Vanda
Baby Dooks gave five points to Andrea
Giuliano gave five points to Mario
Vanda gave five points to Giuliano
Mario gave five points to Ronald
Andrea gave five points to Jasna

Week 8
Guest Judge: Jelena Rozga  Aired: 23 November 2014  Winner: Baby Dooks

Bonus points
Vanda gave five points to Baby Dooks
Giuliano gave five points to Vanda
Jasna gave five points to Mario
Andrea gave five points to Giuliano
Mario gave five points to Andrea
Baby Dooks gave five points to Jasna
Minea gave five points to Minea
Ronald gave five points to Ronald

Week 9
Guest Judge: Luka Nižetić  Aired: 30 November 2014  Winner: Baby Dooks

Bonus points
Minea gave five points to Baby Dooks
Vanda gave five points to Jasna
Ronald gave five points to Mario
Mario gave five points to Giuliano
Giuliano gave five points to Vanda
Baby Dooks gave five points to Ronald
Andrea gave five points to Minea
Jasna gave five points to Andrea

Week 10
Guest Judge: Tonči Huljić  Aired: 7 December 2014  Winner: Mario Petreković

Bonus points
Andrea gave five points to Mario
Jasna gave five points to Mario
Vanda gave five points to Mario
Baby Dooks gave five points to Ronald
Ronald gave five points to Mario
Mario gave five points to Giuliano
Giuliano gave five points to Mario
Minea gave five points to Mario

Week 11

Semi-final
Guest Judge: Nives Celsius  Aired: 14 December 2014  Winner: Giuliano

Bonus points
Mario gave ten points to Minea
Minea gave ten points to Giuliano
Ronald gave five points to Jasna
Vanda gave five points to Baby Dooks
Baby Dooks gave five points to Vanda
Jasna gave five points to Andrea
Andrea gave five points to Ronald
Giuliano gave five points to Mario

Week 12

Final
Guest Judge: Severina  Aired: 21 December 2014  Winner: Mario Petreković

Interval acts

Bonus points
Ronald and Jasna gave five points to Mario
Andrea and Minea gave ten points to Mario
Giuliano gave five points to Baby Dooks
Vanda gave ten points to Baby Dooks
Baby Dooks gave five points to Giuliano
Mario gave five points to Vanda

See also
Tvoje lice zvuči poznato (Croatian season 2)
Tvoje lice zvuči poznato (Croatian season 3)
Tvoje lice zvuči poznato (Croatian season 4)
Tvoje lice zvuči poznato (Croatian season 5)

References

Croatia
2014 Croatian television seasons